Honduras competed at the 1976 Summer Olympics in Montreal, Quebec, Canada.
The nation returned to the Olympic Games after missing the 1972 Summer Olympics.

Results by event

Athletics
Men's Marathon
 Hipolito Lopez — 2:26:00 (→ 41st place)
 Luís Raudales — 2:29:25 (→ 49th place)

Men's 20 km Race Walk
 Santiago Fonseca — 1:36:07 (→ 27th place)

References
Official Olympic Reports

Nations at the 1976 Summer Olympics
1976
1976 in Honduran sport